Parts of Gdańsk, Poland (also known in German as Danzig) is located on a small group of islands in the Baltic Sea. This is a comprehensive list of the islands, their area and population.

Port Island
Area: 25.7 km2
Population: 22,167 people. 
Sobieszewo Island
Area: 34.3 km² 
Population: 3,570 people. 
Ostrów Island
Area: 2.2 km² 
Two shipyards.
 Granary Island
Area: 0.24 km²
Ołowianka

See also
List of islands of Poland

References

Gdańsk
Gdansk
Islands of Poland
Lists of landforms of Poland
Landforms of Pomeranian Voivodeship